Leaksville-Spray Institute, also known as Leaksville-Spray Academy and Leaksville-Spray Intermediate School, was a historic school complex located at Eden, Rockingham County, North Carolina. The complex consisted of the Administration Building, the Girls Home, both finished by 1905, and the classroom and auditorium building constructed in 1930.  They were large two-story, Colonial Revival style brick buildings, with the Girls Home having some Queen Anne style design elements.  The classroom and auditorium building connected the two other buildings.  It has been demolished.

It was listed on the National Register of Historic Places in 1989.

References

School buildings on the National Register of Historic Places in North Carolina
Queen Anne architecture in North Carolina
Colonial Revival architecture in North Carolina
School buildings completed in 1905
Schools in Rockingham County, North Carolina
National Register of Historic Places in Rockingham County, North Carolina
Defunct schools in North Carolina
1905 establishments in North Carolina